The AfreecaTV StarCraft League (ASL) is a StarCraft: Remastered tournament series hosted by afreecaTV in South Korea. It began its first season in June 2016 and used StarCraft: Brood War for its first three seasons prior to the release of StarCraft: Remastered. It is broadcast regularly in Korean on afreecaTV. Dan "Artosis" Stemkoski and Nicolas "Tasteless" Plott provide English rebroadcasts on AfreecaTV's YouTube channel.

In 2018 and 2019 it ran alongside Blizzard Entertainment's Korea StarCraft League (KSL) as one of the two top level Korean leagues for StarCraft: Remastered. On March 20, 2020, Blizzard discontinued the KSL tournament series, once again leaving the ASL as the only top level Korean league for StarCraft: Remastered.

Results

References

Esports competitions in South Korea
StarCraft competitions
2016 establishments in South Korea